Gillham may refer to:

Gillham, Arkansas, a town in Sevier County, Arkansas, United States
Gillham Lake, a reservoir in Howard County and Polk County, Arkansas

People with the surname
Art Gillham (1895–1961), American songwriter
Jayson Gillham (born 1986), Australian classical pianist
Mary Gillham (1921–2013), English naturalist and writer
Nicholas Gillham (1932–2018), American geneticist
Ron Gillham, American politician

See also
Gillham Road, a street in Kansas, Missouri
Gillham code